Tabata is an administrative ward in the Ilala District of the Dar es Salaam Region of Tanzania. According to the 2002 census, the ward has a total population of 46,228.

Tabata was mapped by the Ramani Huria project in October–November 2015 and data is available on OpenStreetMap.

References

Ilala District
Wards of Dar es Salaam Region